"Your Heart's Not in It" is a song written by Tom Shapiro, Michael Garvin and Bucky Jones, and recorded by American country music artist Janie Fricke.  It was released in August 1984 as the first single from the album The First Word in Memory.  The song was Fricke's sixth number one on the country chart.  The single stayed at number one for a single week and spent a total of thirteen weeks on the country chart.

Chart performance

References

Janie Fricke songs
1984 singles
Songs written by Tom Shapiro
Song recordings produced by Bob Montgomery (songwriter)
Columbia Records singles
Songs written by Michael Garvin
Songs written by Bucky Jones
1984 songs